Mvula Jordan Lotomba (born 29 September 1998) is a Swiss professional footballer who plays as a right-back for Ligue 1 club Nice and the Switzerland national team.

Club career

Lausanne-Sport
Lotomba was trained in the Lausanne-Sport academy. He made his Swiss Super League debut on 24 July 2016 against Grasshopper Club Zürich.

Young Boys
Having joined Young Boys in the summer of 2017 he scored the goal that sealed victory against Dynamo Kyiv in the UEFA champions league.

He was part of the Young Boys squad that won the 2017–18 Swiss Super League, their first league title for 32 years. During the 2019–20 season, Lotomba became a key member of the squad, making 35 appearances for the club as they won a third successive Super League title.

Nice 
On 3 August 2020, Lotomba signed for Nice in a deal worth around €5 million.

International career
Lotomba made his Switzerland national team debut on 7 October 2020 in a friendly against Croatia.

On 2 June 2021, he was included in the final 26-man squad for the rescheduled UEFA Euro 2020 tournament.

Personal life
Lotomba was born in Switzerland, and is of Congolese descent through his father and of Angolan descent through his mother.

Career statistics

Club

International

Honours
Young Boys
Swiss Super League: 2017–18, 2018–19, 2019–20

Nice

 Coupe de France runner-up: 2021–22

References

1998 births
Living people
People from Yverdon-les-Bains
Association football midfielders
Swiss men's footballers
Switzerland international footballers
Switzerland youth international footballers
Switzerland under-21 international footballers
Swiss people of Angolan descent
Swiss sportspeople of African descent
FC Lausanne-Sport players
OGC Nice players
Swiss Super League players
Ligue 1 players
UEFA Euro 2020 players
Swiss expatriate footballers
Swiss expatriate sportspeople in France
Expatriate footballers in France
Sportspeople from the canton of Vaud